Baltromiškė is a village in the Jonava district municipality, in Kaunas County located in central Lithuania. According to the 2011 census, the village has a population of 19 people. There is a church of Old Believers. The village is famous for gravel mines.

References

Villages in Jonava District Municipality